County Line is a town in Blount and Jefferson counties in the State of Alabama. At the 2020 census, the population was 311.

Geography

Demographics

At the 2000 census, there were 257 people, 97 households, and 73 families in the town. The racial makeup of the town was 95.72% White, 2.72% Black or African American, and 1.56% from two or more races. 1.17% of the population were Hispanic or Latino of any race.

Of the 97 households 40.2% had children under the age of 18 living with them, 57.7% were married couples living together, 11.3% had a female householder with no husband present, and 24.7% were non-families. 23.7% of households were one person and 7.2% were one person aged 65 or older. The average household size was 2.65 and the average family size was 3.12.

The age distribution was 26.5% under the age of 18, 12.1% from 18 to 24, 31.1% from 25 to 44, 19.8% from 45 to 64, and 10.5% 65 or older. The median age was 33 years. For every 100 females, there were 114.2 males. For every 100 females age 18 and over, there were 110.0 males.

The median household income was $35,625 and the median family income  was $37,500. Males had a median income of $28,500 versus $21,250 for females. The per capita income for the town was $13,621. About 13.8% of families and 17.4% of the population were below the poverty line, including 30.4% of those under the age of eighteen and 9.1% of those sixty five or over.

Local government
County Line incorporated on August 27, 1957, as a town.

References

Towns in Blount County, Alabama
Towns in Jefferson County, Alabama
Towns in Alabama
Birmingham metropolitan area, Alabama